Klepp Stasjon is a village in Klepp municipality in Rogaland county, Norway. The village is named after the Klepp Station, a station on the Jæren railway line.

History
After the station was built, the village of Klepp Stasjon (literally Klepp Station) grew up around the railway station.

References

Villages in Rogaland
Klepp